Easy to Love is a live album by saxophonist Buck Hill which was recorded at the North Sea Jazz Festival in 1981 and released on the SteepleChase label.

Track listing
All compositions by Reuben Brown except where noted
 "Easy to Love" (Cole Porter) – 9:41
 "Little Face" – 9:36
 "Mr. Barrow" – 7:57
 "Spaces" – 7:03
 "Brakes" (Buck Hill) – 6:54
 "Two Chord Molly" (Hill) – 8:03 Additional track on CD release

Personnel
Buck Hill – tenor saxophone
Reuben Brown – piano 
Wilbur Little – bass 
Billy Hart – drums

References

SteepleChase Records live albums
Buck Hill (musician) live albums
1982 live albums